The men's sabre was a fencing event held as part of the Fencing at the 1912 Summer Olympics programme. It was the fifth appearance of the event.

The Hungarian fencers dominated the competition, with all 12 advancing to the semifinals. In 2 of the 4 semifinals, the Hungarians took the top three places. In a third, Hungarian fencers took the two qualifying spots while the third Hungarian did not start. In the remaining semifinal, Nedo Nadi of Italy placed second to become the only non-Hungarian fencer to advance to the final (the three Hungarians took first, third, and fourth in that semifinal).

The final consisted of 7 Hungarian fencers and Nadi. Nadi took fifth. Jenő Fuchs successfully defended his 1908 Olympic title, the first man to win multiple medals in the sabre. Béla Békessy took silver and Ervin Mészáros earned bronze.

Background

This was the fifth appearance of the event, which is the only fencing event to have been held at every Summer Olympics. Four of the eight finalists from 1908 returned: gold medalist Jenő Fuchs, silver medalist Béla Zulawszky, fifth-place finisher Péter Tóth, and sixth-place finisher Lajos Werkner, all of Hungary. Hungary was dominant in the sabre; Fuchs' 1908 victory started a run that lasted through 1964 in which the only Games that Hungary did not win the event was the one to which the nation was not invited (1920).

Russia and Sweden each made their debut in the men's sabre. Austria made its fourth appearance in the event, most of any nation, having missed only the 1904 Games in St. Louis.

Competition format

The competition was held over four rounds. In each round, each pool held a round-robin. European sabre rules at the time used a larger target area than the post-World War I standard. In 1896, 1900, and 1908, the target area had been the whole body; the 1912 rules reduced that to "all body parts, located above the horizontal line passing through the crotch". (The 1904 competition used the American rules which became the standard now used.) Double hits were possible under the rules of the time.

 First round: 16 pools of between 3 to 5 fencers each. The top 3 fencers in each pool advanced to the quarterfinals. 
 Quarterfinals: 8 pools of 6 fencers each (before withdrawals). The top 3 fencers in each pool advanced to the semifinals. 
 Semifinals: 4 pools of 6 fencers each. The top 2 fencers in each pool advanced to the final.
 Final: 1 pool of 8 fencers.

Schedule

Results

Round 1

Pool A

Pool B

Pool C

Pool D

Pool E

Pool F

Pool G

Pool H

Pool I

Pool J

Poolol K

Pool L

Pool M

Pool N

Pool O

Pool P

Quarterfinals

Quarterfinal A

Quarterfinal B

Quarterfinal C

Quarterfinal D

Quarterfinal E

Quarterfinal F

Quarterfinal G

Quarterfinal H

Semifinals

Semifinal A

Semifinal B

Semifinal C

Semifinal D

Final

References

 
 

Fencing at the 1912 Summer Olympics